
Gmina Majdan Królewski is a rural gmina (administrative district) in Kolbuszowa County, Subcarpathian Voivodeship, in southeastern Poland.

Villages
Gmina Majdan Królewski contains the villages and settlements of Brzostowa Góra, Huta Komorowska, Komorów, Krzątka, Majdan Królewski, Stary Rusinów and Wola Rusinowska.

Neighbouring gminas
Gmina Majdan Królewski is bordered by the gminas of Baranów Sandomierski, Bojanów, Cmolas, Dzikowiec and Nowa Dęba.

References
Polish official population figures 2006

Majdan Krolewski
Kolbuszowa County